Colorado River Indian Tribes v. National Indian Gaming Commission, 05-5402 (D.C. Cir. 2006), was a decision of the United States Court of Appeals for the District of Columbia Circuit that was handed down on October 20, 2006.

See also
United States Court of Appeals for the District of Columbia Circuit
List of notable United States Courts of Appeals cases
National Indian Gaming Commission
Indian Gaming Regulatory Act

External links

Eleven page PDF of the decision from the DC Circuit
Court Rules U.S. Can't Make Rules for How Las Vegas-Style Games Are Played at Indian Casinos ABC News, October 20, 2006.
United States Court of Appeals for the District of Columbia Circuit Court's web site

United States Court of Appeals for the District of Columbia Circuit cases
United States Native American gaming case law